The American Task Force Argentina is a group of American stakeholders that seek the full payment of Argentine debt to holdouts and vulture funds. The Argentine government compared it with an actual task force, operating against Argentina.

See also
 Argentine debt restructuring

References

External links
 Official site 

Argentina–United States relations